Beginning on July 24, 2022, and lasting for a week, many flash flooding events hit several areas of the United States. These areas included parts of Missouri and Illinois, especially Greater St. Louis, Eastern Kentucky, Southwest Virginia, parts of West Virginia, and the Las Vegas Valley. Several rounds of severe thunderstorms began in Missouri on July 24, culminating during July 25 and 26, when St. Louis broke its previous 1915 record for the most rainfall in a span of 24 hours. Governor Mike Parson declared a state of emergency on July 26. Over one hundred people were rescued from floods, and two people were killed. Late on July 27 and into July 28, historic flooding began in central Appalachia, particularly in Kentucky, where a state of emergency was declared. A total of 38 people were killed in Kentucky as a direct result of flooding, with a 39th fatality occurring days later during cleanup efforts and a 40th coming in September during cleanup efforts in Pike County.

Late July 28, another unprecedented flash flooding event occurred in Las Vegas after parts of the city saw over an inch of rainfall. Much of the Las Vegas Strip became inundated, with roads, casinos, and parking garages being affected and flights being delayed or cancelled. More flooding continued from July 30 to August 1 in Arizona, including Phoenix and Flagstaff, California, including Death Valley National Park, and again in the same areas of Eastern Kentucky. In all, 41 people were killed during the flooding events: 39 in Kentucky on July 28 and 2 in Missouri on July 26.

More flooding events continued throughout August, impacting areas such as Death Valley, the Dallas–Fort Worth metroplex, and central Mississippi. A flash flood in Zion National Park in Utah led to one fatality. The Dallas flooding on August 22 led to an additional fatality and four injuries.

Meteorological synopsis

On the morning of July 26, the Weather Prediction Center (WPC) issued a moderate risk outlook for excessive rainfall over portions of eastern Missouri and southern Illinois and Indiana associated with an expected band of training thunderstorms over the region. Later, the National Weather Service issued its first-ever flash flood emergencies for Saint Louis. Parts of Kentucky and West Virginia were affected by flooding on July 26 as well, including Johnson, Magoffin, and Floyd counties in Kentucky and Mingo and McDowell counties in West Virginia.

Training thunderstorms began to form over Eastern Kentucky during the early hours of July 27, producing heavy rainfall periodically throughout the day. During the late evening and overnight hours, a more substantial band of heavy rain and thunderstorms moved west to east along a stalled frontal boundary, resulting in subsequent extreme flooding across the counties of Perry, Knott, Breathitt, Letcher, Leslie, Clay, Owsley, Wolfe, Harlan, Johnson, Magoffin, Floyd, and Pike. Flooding was also reported in Southwest Virginia, in the areas of Wise and Dickenson counties, and the independent city of Norton, which are along the Kentucky border. On the morning of July 28, the WPC issued a moderate risk outlook for excessive rainfall over portions of Central and Eastern Kentucky and West Virginia. The rainfall began to move towards West Virginia and central Kentucky the following day, and began to encompass almost all of West Virginia on July 29. On the morning of July 29, the WPC issued a moderate risk outlook for excessive rainfall, but shifted it into Eastern Kentucky and almost all of West Virginia.

On the morning of July 31, a third moderate risk outlook for excessive rainfall was issued by the WPC over portions of Eastern Kentucky, with more flooding occurring that night over the same areas as four days earlier.

Elsewhere on July 30 and 31, Phoenix and Flagstaff, Arizona, along with rural areas of Arizona and southeast California sustained flooding due to heavy rain associated with the Southwest monsoon.

On the morning of August 2, the Weather Prediction Center issued a moderate risk of excessive rainfall for parts of southern Illinois and Indiana and parts of western Kentucky.

On the morning of August 7, WPC issued a moderate risk for excessive rainfall across portions of northeastern Iowa and southern Wisconsin.

Impacts

St. Louis area

July 26
Thirty miles (48 km) of I-70 were closed because of the floods, with some vehicles completely submerged. The Gateway Arch was closed on July 26 due to the flooding. Flood damage to the MetroLink light rail transit system in St. Louis was estimated at $18–20 million. In St. Peters, ten puppies at an animal rescue shelter died in the flooding. Dardenne Creek in St. Peters rose over  into major flood stage over the span of seven hours. The fire department in St. Louis rescued people from 18 homes, transporting some people and pets out by boat. Homes in Brentwood and Ladue were threatened by floodwater as well, with some residents evacuating.

This included  in just six hours. Over 20,000 residents lost power.

Flash flooding extended into Illinois along the I-64 corridor in St. Clair County, and a nursing home was evacuated in Caseyville. Residents were assisted from two houses in town, and city parks sustained damage to parking lots, playgrounds, and bathrooms. Cahokia Heights had 15 to 20 homes with flood damage, along with more flooded streets, and Caseyville had a levee breach, leading to the evacuation of the nursing home. Other areas, such as East St. Louis and Swansea, had more flooded homes, while more communities escaped with only minor roadway flooding.

West Virginia

July 26
Flooding on July 26 impacted parts of southwestern West Virginia. In Mingo County, the Gilbert Creek area along the Kentucky/Virginia/West Virginia border had several homes impacted and several bridges washed out, limiting access to some areas. More flooding occurred in nearby McDowell County as well, in addition to other areas. This, combined with additional rainfall and flooding on July 28, led to a state of emergency being declared by Governor Jim Justice for six counties: Mingo, McDowell, Fayette, Greenbrier, Logan, and Wyoming.

Kentucky/Virginia

July 28
Governor of Kentucky Andy Beshear declared a state of emergency on July 28. after what was described as a thousand-year flooding event. The Kentucky Court of Justice closed the judicial centers in Floyd, Letcher, Magoffin, and Perry counties due to the extreme flooding. Kentucky cities severely affected by the floods include Hazard, Jackson, Paintsville, Prestonsburg, Martin, Pikeville, Hindman, Whitesburg, Fleming-Neon, and Jenkins.

Many roads were shut down in these areas including Main Street in Hazard, Mayo Trail in Pikeville, KY 317 in Fleming-Neon, Lakeside Drive and Main Street in Jenkins, South Fork Road, South Mountain Road, Bold Camp Road, and Main Street in Pound, Virginia, and portions of US 23 in Wise, Virginia. Evacuations were ordered in the downtown areas of cities that were severely flooded including Hazard, Fleming-Neon, Jenkins, Martin, Pound, and Clintwood, Virginia. The North Fork of the Kentucky River set record high crests in Whitesburg and Jackson, and over 33,000 customers lost electricity.

In Hindman in Knott County, nearly all buildings in the downtown area sustained some level of flood damage from Troublesome Creek, which passes through the area. The Appalachian Artisan Center sustained extensive damage to the museum and several studios, a new swimming pool and skatepark in town were severely damaged, and many homes and businesses were heavily damaged or destroyed. Nearby, Hindman Settlement School and Appalachian School of Luthiery were both flooded with several feet of water and heavily damaged, along with the Troublesome Creek Stringed Instrument Company. Upstream from Hindman, Alice Lloyd College in Pippa Passes sustained major damage due to Troublesome Creek, along with the surrounding community. Just northwest of Hindman, in a particularly tragic incident, four children were killed when they were swept out of their mother's arms along Montgomery Creek. Both parents survived despite being stranded in a tree for eight hours.

In Letcher County, Whitesburg and surrounding communities were severely impacted by the North Fork River and Rockhouse Creek. Many businesses were destroyed in Whitesburg, including a used car dealership that had been in business for four decades. At Appalshop, which housed a vast media collection of Appalachian history, some of the media vault's contents were swept away and scattered about, including film of oral history, musical performances, and photo collections.

Buckhorn in Perry County was inundated by Squabble Creek, a tributary of the Middle Fork of the Kentucky River, with numerous homes and Buckhorn School being completely flooded. Pavement was pulled up from the parking lot, and classrooms within the school building were destroyed ahead of the school's scheduled start date of August 11. Robinson Elementary in the Ary community of northern Perry County sustained exterior wall and roof collapse along Troublesome Creek, downstream of Hindman and Knott County. Further along the creek in Breathitt County, the community of Lost Creek was also inundated, with roads covered and homes swept off their foundations.

The Oneida community in Clay County was cut-off by downed power lines and washed-out roads and bridges, with floodwater impacting many homes that had previously been flooded by an event in March 2020.

Parts of Floyd and Johnson counties were impacted by severe thunderstorms and flooding first on July 26, affecting homes and roads. More severe flooding occurred on July 28, with the towns of Martin, Wayland, and Garrett in Floyd County being among those impacted. Numerous water rescues were conducted, with people being taken to the Wayland Fire Department, among other places. KY 7, KY 122, and KY 550 in Floyd County were shut down due to floodwaters.

Pike County in far eastern Kentucky also sustained flooding, with multiple roads being blocked by downed trees and power lines as well. In the Virgie area, south of Pikeville, Shelby Creek overran its banks and inundated several homes, leading to the closure of KY 610 in the area.

Late on July 28 and into July 29, part of the city of Jackson was evacuated and KY 15 was closed after officials became concerned that water from the North Fork River would top Panbowl Dam along KY 15 and potentially flood approximately 110 homes, 13 businesses, and other structures around Panbowl Lake, although the river began receding before the dam was overtopped.

The fatality count from the event in Kentucky reached 38, with 17 deaths occurring in Knott County, nine in Breathitt County, seven in Perry County, three in Letcher County, and two in Clay County. A 39th fatality occurred in the days following the event due to illness contracted during cleanup efforts. A 40th fatality occurred in September during cleanup efforts in Pike County.

University professors and data analysts described the extreme flooding as made more likely by climate change in the United States. Meteorologist Jeff Berardelli of WFLA in Tampa, Florida commented that the flooding in Kentucky was "simply in its own universe", and that an event that would happen on average one in a thousand years before global warming made its likelihood greater. The government's Fourth National Climate Assessment says that the heaviest precipitation events have intensified.

Criticism was lobbied at local mining companies for failing to return the land to its natural state after decades of mining caused the loss of the natural ridge lines and vegetation.

The rainfall observed over the region during the period of July 25–30 was over 600 percent of normal totals.

July 31 – August 1
More rainfall over waterlogged areas led to more flooding on August 1 in Knott and Letcher counties. Downtown areas of Hindman and Fleming-Neon were again inundated by floodwaters in the early hours of August 1. KY 550 was again flooded in Knott County, affecting the communities of Mousie and Fisty, along with Hindman. Flooding was also reported in other areas such as Floyd County, Pike County, and Harlan County. Roads in Floyd County were flooded or blocked by downed trees and power lines.

As a result of flooding on July 28 and again on August 1, Fleming-Neon was left with its city hall, bank, pharmacy, and post office flooded, with more than a foot of mud covering the inside of the city hall building.

Las Vegas Valley

July 28
On the night of July 28, another flash flooding event occurred in the Las Vegas Valley in southern Nevada. Harry Reid International Airport saw  of rainfall in two hours, the monthly average for all of July. Parts of Clark County saw  of rain, causing disruptive flash flooding. This heavy rain flooded casinos and parking garages along the Las Vegas Strip, and over 16,000 customers lost power.

Casinos on the Strip that were impacted included Caesars Palace and Planet Hollywood, with water pouring through parts of the ceilings into the buildings. Las Vegas Boulevard and Main Street, especially in downtown and the area of the Strip, were covered in water, creating traffic problems. Fire departments and first responders had 330 calls for flooding and swift water service, with seven people being rescued from floodwaters.

Arizona/California

July 25–31
Rain beginning on July 25 in the Flagstaff, Arizona area associated with the monsoon season led to increased flash flooding concerns throughout the week, due in part to the burn scars from the recent wildfires. By July 27, Flagstaff mayor Paul Deasy had declared a state of emergency as numerous areas around Flagstaff had been impacted by flooding, including Mt. Elden Estates, Paradise, Grandview, and Sunnyside. Other neighborhoods such as Cheshire, Coconino Estates, Creighton Estates, Coyote Springs, Anasazi Ridge were later added to the state of emergency order. Schultz Creek overflowed in the area, resulting in the temporary closure of US 180 on the west side of Flagstaff.

On July 30, areas on the north side of Phoenix along I-17 received  of rain, mostly within one hour. This led to flooding of roads and low-lying areas and prompted four water rescues, two of which were from partially submerged vehicles. A voting precinct in Downtown Phoenix was closed by the Maricopa County Elections Department due to flooding in the building, forcing it to be relocated elsewhere within the building for subsequent days. Numerous streets in Phoenix became temporarily flooded due to the heavy rain. Several homes and apartment complexes became flooded as well.

In southern California, Death Valley National Park and the Mojave National Preserve were impacted by flooding on July 30 and 31, resulting in numerous road and campground closures and damaged/destroyed vehicles. Heavy rain in the San Bernardino National Forest resulted in mudslides that blocked roads near Yucaipa.

August 5
All roads into Death Valley National Park were closed due to major flash flooding. The  of rain set a record for Death Valley's record highest daily precipitation total, making up around 75 percent of the area's annual precipitation.

Illinois/Mississippi

August 2
Parts of central Illinois received very heavy rainfall from the evening of August 1 into August 2. Numerous counties were impacted by flooding, with flooding reported near the cities of Decatur, Dawson, Spaulding, and Barclay. In downtown Decatur, numerous roadways were flooded, leaving vehicles submerged.

Areas near Canton, Mississippi also received very heavy rainfall on August 2, leading to flash flooding that trapped people in homes in Madison County. Roads were closed due to high water, and vehicles were submerged along roadways and in parking lots.

August 24–27
Parts of Central Mississippi received very heavy rainfall starting on August 24. This led to severe effects on water systems near Jackson, leaving many residents without clean drinking water. At one point, the city temporarily ran out of bottled water to give to residents. During the storm, parts of I-20 closed.

These floods contributed largely toward August 2022 becoming the wettest August on record for Mississippi.

Utah

August 19
One woman was killed when she was swept away in a flash flood in Zion National Park. Her body was discovered on August 22 after a search involving over 170 people.

Texas

August 21–22
Starting late on August 21, 2022, and going into the next morning, a significant flash flooding event occurred in the Dallas–Fort Worth metroplex in Texas, killing one person and injuring four others. Before this rainfall event, 2022 was shaping up to be one of the hottest and driest years ever recorded in Texas. On the morning of August 21, the Weather Prediction Center (WPC) issued a moderate risk for excessive rainfall for North and Northeast Texas. On August 22, WPC issued a new moderate risk for excessive rainfall for North and Northeast Texas as well as portions of North Louisiana. At 1:20 am. CDT on August 22, the National Weather Service issued a flash flood warning for the Dallas metroplex.

Overnight on August 21, Dallas Fort Worth International Airport reported  of rainfall over a one-hour timeframe, setting the record for the most rainfall in a single hour ever for the airport. By 8 am. The amount of rainfall that Dallas normally sees during all of summer fell within 24 hours. This broke a record for most rain in 24 hours since 1932. Also, this made 2022 the wettest August in Dallas history. This also meant that, despite 67 consecutive days with no measurable precipitation during the summer, Dallas still had their 9th wettest summer on record.

The flooding event caused over 314 car crashes and 319 high water calls. Nearly 300 flights were cancelled and 900 were delayed between the two Dallas airports. Dallas Fort Worth International Airport, and 37,000 other customers, lost power. One person was killed and four people were injured in the floods.

Around 10:15 am. Minimal damage occurred to a school and other structures near Winona. Due to the floods, drought improved across parts of northern Texas.

Aftermath
St. Louis County declared a state of emergency in the aftermath of flooding in the area. On July 28, Kentucky Governor Andy Beshear commented, "We are currently experiencing one of the worst, most devastating flooding events in Kentucky's history." On July 29, President Joe Biden declared that a major disaster existed in Kentucky and ordered federal aid to supplement state and local recovery efforts in the areas affected by severe storms, flooding, landslides, and mudslides. On July 30, Urban Search and Rescue Missouri Task Force 1 was deployed to eastern Kentucky.

On July 29, Illinois governor J. B. Pritzker declared St. Clair County, including East St. Louis, a disaster area, and the city of East St. Louis later declared a state of emergency following the flooding on July 26.

A shelter was opened on July 28 at the Breathitt County Courthouse in Jackson for displaced residents, as well as other shelters in schools and churches around Perry County and Hazard and the Floyd County Community Center near the town of Martin. Wolfe County, north of Jackson, opened three school buildings as shelters as well. About 150 residents were housed at nearby state parks, while at least another 150 went to American Red Cross shelters. Curfews were established in areas such as Hindman and Breathitt County after reports of looting.

Some residents in Kentucky were stuck in their homes, unable to leave because of washed out roads and bridges, leading to over 420 people being rescued by helicopter or boat. By August 2, more than 5,600 customers in eastern Kentucky were still without power and more than 18,000 service connections were without water. An additional 45,600 customers were under a boil water advisory, according to Governor Beshear. Numerous people remained stranded in rural areas as a result of roads being washed away, with the only access in some instances being by ATV. The infrastructure problems caused difficulty in pinpointing the number of missing people in the days after the event.

The office manager of Troublesome Creek Stringed Instrument Company in Hindman set up a GoFundMe account for donations to help with flood relief, while Appalshop and Hindman Settlement School received help to keep valuable media archives refrigerated to prevent ruin. Some archives were transported to a freezer at East Tennessee State University in the days after the event.

School systems in Perry, Breathitt, and Floyd counties delayed the start of the school year due to recovery efforts. Several classrooms in Breathitt County were destroyed, along with the district's maintenance building and the bus garage. Several other counties in the area had modified starts to the school year as well.

The University of Kentucky men's basketball team announced plans to play two games against Gonzaga, in 2022 and 2023, to raise money for Kentucky flood relief.

See also 
 Weather of 2022
 2021 Tennessee floods – A similar flooding event that occurred primarily in Humphreys County, Tennessee the year before.
 2022 Montana floods – A similar flooding event that occurred one month before.
 2022–2023 California floods - Flooding event that started in December 2022

References

External links
 Coverage of the St. Louis area flooding by the National Weather Service

Floods
Floods
Floods
Floods
Floods
Floods
Floods
Floods
Floods
Floods
Floods
Floods
Floods
Floods
Floods
Floods
Floods
Floods
Floods
Floods
Floods
Floods
Floods
Floods
Floods
Floods